Arbanitis monteithi is a species of armoured trap-door spider in the family Idiopidae, and is endemic to Queensland. 

It was first described by Robert Raven & Graham Wishart in 2006 as Misgolas monteithi, but was transferred to the genus, Arbanitis, by Michael Rix and others in 2017.

References

Idiopidae
Spiders described in 2006
Spiders of Australia
Fauna of Queensland
Taxa named by Robert Raven